The Housing Commission of Victoria (often shortened to Housing Commission, especially colloquially) was a Government of Victoria body responsible for public housing in Victoria, Australia. It was established in 1938, and was abolished in 1984.

The main activity of the commission was the construction tens of thousands of houses and flats in Melbourne and many country towns between the late 1940s and the early 70s, providing low rent housing for low income families. The most visible legacy of the commission is the 47 or so high-rise apartment towers in inner Melbourne, all built using the same pre-cast concrete panel technology.

History
Establishment

Through the 1920s and early 1930s, a campaign highlighting the dreadful conditions and moral dangers of the 'slums' of inner city Melbourne was led by social reformer Oswald Barnett. During the Great Depression Barnett wrote a first major broadside entitled "The unsuspected slums, an illustrated summary of a thesis submitted to the University of Melbourne exploring the slum problem in Melbourne. Barnett received high praise for his thesis which was later published by the Melbourne Herald Group and resulted in his appointment of the Housing commission in Victoria, serving from 1938 to 1948. In the run-down rented housing in the inner city areas deteriorated during the Great Depression, creating a 'housing crisis'. Barnett's campaigning against slums led to the establishment the Housing Investigation and Slum Abolition Board (HISAB) in July 1936. The HISAB's 1937 report found 3,000 houses 'unfit for habitation' and recommended the establishment of a housing commission. John O’Connor was the commission's first chairman, while Oswald Barnett, Oswald Burt and Frances Pennington were appointed as part-time commissioners.

The Housing Commission of Victoria was established under the Housing Act 1937 to improve existing housing conditions and to provide adequate housing for persons of limited means; the Slum Reclamation Act 1938 and the Reclamation and Housing (Financial) Act 1938 provided the framework for the commission's work. On the passing of the legislation, the Victorian Premier, Albert Dunstan, declared the beginning of the commission's activities as a 'war on slums', but also recognised the magnitude of the task before it. The legislation not only gave the commission powers for housing construction and improvement, but also made it 'a planning authority in its own right'. Dunstan made a personal tour of the slum with the guidance of Oswald Barnett's Slum Abolition Group, which proposed to use unemployment relief funds for the rehousing of slum occupants to rentals based on social rather than economic conditions. Commission's chief concerns however, were the 'slum pockets' which required 'excision' for the 'common good'. The commission developed a plan of action in March 1938, concentrating its attention on 1,240 houses in lanes, rights-of-way and slum pockets, referred to in HISAB's earlier report. Slums were to be reclaimed and people rehoused.

To house the people moved from the slum areas, the commission needed to provide new homes. The commission's first estate was an extension to the Garden City Estate in Port Melbourne, where pre-cast concrete technologies were employed for the first time. Next was the development of flats at Pigdon Street, Carlton, though the original proposal for three storey flats was reduced to two storeys after local opposition. The commission then began to acquire cheap land in the northern suburbs of Coburg, Brunswick, Preston and Northcote as well as in inner suburban areas such as North Melbourne, Fitzroy and Richmond. The few estates built by the commission before World War II comprised modestly scaled suburban style housing, in simple brick construction, mostly as duplexes, such as the Racecourse Estate in Richmond, and the Railton Grove Precinct in Preston.

The commission's acquisition plans were ambitious and it was bound to come across difficulties. The synchronisation of the 'demolition program' was proving difficult and by June 1940, only 53 families had moved into new houses while only 99 houses had been ordered for demolition. The commission also had difficulties dealing with local municipalities, in acquiring properties in the North Melbourne reclamation area as well as with the labour movement, who believed that the government should subsidise loans to enable workers to buy homes rather than rent them. The rehousing of those from the slums was a difficult task.

As a landlord, the commission also experienced problems. Tenants were initially reluctant to move, while rents on the estates were more expensive than in their former accommodation. At Fishermans Bend, there was tension between tenants of the commission's estate and those who had bought homes under an earlier housing program; vandalism was also a problem, both at Fishermans Bend and in the West Brunswick estate. Frances Penington, who was also a social worker, advocated for community facilities to be built at the estates to alleviate some of these problems, these were built after protracted debate by others on the commission. Transportation costs from the new estates to places of employment were also an issue. Despite these issues, residents 'adjusted to their new homes and locations' and appreciated the 'better home environment'.

By 1942, building had halted as the commission shifted its focus to post-war planning. It continued to acquire land though, taking advantage of low prices by purchasing land in industrial areas in the western suburbs as well as in the middle class eastern and southern suburbs. The commission, in its planning authority capacity had also drawn up plans for the future development of Melbourne but by 1944, it was lacking resources to deal with backlogs of council plans. The commission recruited Frank Heath from its advisory Architects Panel to deal with these problems but it was stripped of its town planning powers later in the same year. The commission's 1944 report found that housing was required in 'large numbers as quickly as possible to house those recently returned to civilian life and catch up on the lag of construction over the war years'. The end of the slum abolitionism was in part due to the ambiguity surrounding what constituted a slum. Slum abolitionists were left disappointed because the sensationalism carried by the slum problem were communicated to the mainstream community over messages such as social inequity and social reform.

While the commission was planning for the future, so were its commissioners. Barnett and Burt published Housing the Australian Nation, reviewing the slum reclamation, but also putting forward their plans for a national housing policy. Barnett, Burt and Heath published We Must Go On calling for a fairer society and centralised planning. By now, housing for growing numbers was the main concern.

Post War

After World War II, with greater funding and a severe housing shortage, the commission's activities greatly expanded through the late 1940s into the 1950s. The began to build larger and larger estates of housing in the suburban fringes, as well as country towns, of both single homes and duplexes, from stylish Old English style double brick to simple unadorned prefabricated weatherboard. The compulsory purchase and demolition of blocks of 'slums' in the inner and middle ring suburbs also gathered pace, usually replaced by apartment buildings of various designs, from long two storey blocks of prefabricated construction placed diagonally on the blocks in a garden setting to concentrated blocks of concrete and brick four storey walk-ups.

The commission was keen to produce the largest number of house at the lowest cost, and in an era when prefabrication was widely regarded as the most efficient construction method, the commission continued its pre-war development of precast concrete houses. In 1946 the former Commonwealth Tank factory building in suburban Holmesglen was leased to the Victorian Housing Commission, and transformed into a 'Housing Factory' for the production of prefabricated concrete houses and flats. The entire operation became a production line process and by 1948, 1,000 houses had been produced. In the middle 1950s, the factory was producing two to four storey walk up flats, and by 1964 the Concrete House Project was turning out pre-cast walls for villas as well as walk-ups and would soon be producing the components for high rise towers.

Approximately 27 of these precast concrete 20 to 30 storey height buildings were constructed around Melbourne, until the type of development fell into disrepute. By 1970 nearly 4000 privately owned dwellings had been compulsory acquired and replaced by nearly 7000 high rise flats.

Production then moved to low rise walk up and single dwelling units, with about 10,000 homes using locally engineered design and erection methods constructed using the technology. Public housing was also built in regional Victorian cities, such as Wangaratta, Wodonga and Geelong.

In the period of the 1960s-70s large scale redevelopment of the Housing Commission of Victoria caused the displacement of low-income residents, living in boarding houses, cheap rental accommodation and public housing. For many of the former residents residing in the inner-city areas whose houses were demolished by the Housing Commission of Victoria, few were resettled in the inner city.

In the early 1970s with the towers out of favour, the commission turned back to building large suburban estates, including the creation of satellite towns in Pakenham, Sunbury and Melton. The purchase of the land however was poorly handled, the commission spending $11 million on land, some of which was not suitable for housing, and handing handsome profits to speculators. This 'land scandal' led to a Royal Commission in 1979 which found no evidence of corruption.

The commission became part of a new Ministry of Housing in 1973, and in 1984 the commission structure was abolished in favour of an Office of Housing within the Ministry of Housing and subsequent similar Ministries. In 2018, Public housing is administered by the Housing, Infrastructure, Sport and Recreation division of the Department of Health & Human Services.

Victorian Public Tenants Association 
Victoria is the only State which has a peak body to represent people who live in public housing, and people on the waiting list. The Victorian Public Tenants Association was first formed in 2000 as a peak body for Tenant Groups. The organisation now represents people who live in public housing individually, as well as those who have applications on the joint public and community housing waitlist, the Victorian Housing Register.

They operate a free telephone advice line, as well as advocate directly for system wide improvements to policies and procedures, urgent construction of more public housing and on other social justice issues that impact on people who are homeless, insecurely housed or living in public housing.

1960s high rises

There are 28 sites, spread across 19 suburbs in inner Melbourne that contain around 47 high rises in total. The largest sites contain four towers each as well as a numerous walk-up flats (many replaced in the 2010s); Elizabeth Street, Richmond, Atherton Gardens, Fitzroy, Lygon Street Carlton and Racecourse Road, Flemington. Other large sites contain three buildings; Boundary Road, North Melbourne and Malvern Road, South Yarra. The towers vary between 20 and 30 storeys in height and come in a variety of plan forms; S, T, Y, I, L and C-shape, the most common being the S-shape. The high-rises have become somewhat iconic, the instantly recognisable image of the Melbourne 'Housing Commission Tower Block' has been used in artworks, film and TV, and as a graphics on T-shirts, bags and the like.

Sites
Albert Park
Victoria Avenue (Corner of Reed Street), 1 building (I-Shaped)

Brunswick
Barkly Street (Corner of McKay Street), 1 building (S-Shaped)

Carlton
Elgin Street (Corner of Nicholson Street), 2 buildings (I-Shaped)
Lygon Street, 4 buildings (2 S-Shaped, 1 Y-Shaped, 1 T-Shaped)

Collingwood
Hoddle Street (Between Perry & Vere Streets), 2 buildings (S-Shaped)
Wellington Street (Between Perry & Vere Streets), 1 building (S-Shaped)

Fitzroy
Atherton Gardens (Brunswick Street), 4 buildings (S-Shaped)

Flemington
Crown St, 1 building (I-Shaped)
Racecourse Road (Racecourse Road), 4 buildings (4 S-Shaped)

Footscray
Gordon Street (Corner of Shepherd Street), 1 building (T-Shaped)

Kensington
56 Derby Street, 1 building (L-Shaped)
72 Derby Street, 1 building (L-Shaped) (demolished 1999)
94 Ormond Street, 1 building (I-Shaped)

North Melbourne
Boundary Road, 3 buildings (1 S-Shaped, 1 Y-Shaped, 1 T-Shaped)
Canning Street (Corner of Boundary Road), 1 building (I-Shaped)

South Melbourne
Park Towers (Corner of Park & Cecil Streets), 1 building (C-Shaped)
Emerald Hill Court (200 Dorcas Street), 1 building (2 conjoined rectangular towers)

Northcote
Heidelberg Road (Near Merri Creek), 1 building (S-Shaped)

Port Melbourne
Evans Street, 2 buildings

Prahran
King Street (Corner of Little Chapel Street), 2 buildings (T-Shaped)

Richmond
112 Elizabeth Street, 4 buildings (S-Shaped)
Highett Street (Corner of Lennox Street), 1 building (S-Shaped)

St Kilda
Inkerman Street (Corner of Henryville Street), 1 building (T-Shaped)

South Yarra
Malvern Road (Between Bray Street & Surrey Road), 3 buildings (2 Y-Shaped, 1 S-Shaped)

Williamstown
Floyd Lodge (Corner of Thompson & Hanmer Street), 1 building (I-Shaped)
Nelson Heights (Corner of Nelson Place & Pasco Street), 1 building (S-Shape)

Windsor
Union Street, 1 building (S-Shaped)

Windsor
Raleigh Street, 1 building

Various sites in:
Broadmeadows
Braybrook
Sunshine
Doveton

See also
 Public housing in Australia
 HomeGround Services
 Bendigo street housing campaign

References

1960s High Rises:
New houses for old: fifty years of public housing in Victoria 1938–1988, edited by Renate Howe, Ministry of Housing and Construction, Melbourne. 1988.
Museum Victoria Website
Victorian Government Housing Website
Fitzroy: Melbourne’s First Suburb, cutten History Committee of the Fitzroy History Society, Melbourne University Press, Melbourne, 1991.

Former government agencies of Victoria (Australia)
Government agencies established in 1938
Government agencies disestablished in 1982
Public housing in Australia
Public policy in Australia
1938 establishments in Australia
1982 disestablishments in Australia